Pancole may refer to:

Pancole, San Gimignano, a village in the province of Siena, Italy
Pancole, Scansano, a village in the province of Grosseto, Italy